Sukeji "George" Morikami (November 4, 1886 – February 29, 1976) was a Japanese immigrant to the United States who farmed in Palm Beach County, Florida, for more than 65 years. He donated his 200 acres (80 hectares) of farm land to Palm Beach County in 1973.

Morikami was born in Miyazu, Kyoto, Japan. He was 19 years old when he immigrated to the United States on May 3, 1906, to join the Yamato Colony, a Japanese farming community in what is now Boca Raton, Florida. He paid $150 and was indentured for three years in return for his passage to America and spending money. He was to receive $500 and some land at the end of the three years. He intended to take the money and return to Japan. However, Morikami's sponsor died in 1906, and he did not receive any cash or land, and was unable to return to Japan.

Although the Yamato Colony ultimately failed, George Morikami stayed on and eventually prospered. He and other remaining Yamato colonists had their land seized by the United States as the U.S. entered World War II, when their land was taken to create an Army Air Corps training base (see also: Boca Raton Airport). Near the end of the war, Morikami bought land in Delray Beach, Florida, and he would farm it for almost 30 years.

He died at age 89 in 1976, a year after the groundbreaking for Morikami Park, a county park built on the land he donated to Palm Beach County. His ashes were eventually returned to Miyazu. There is a monument to him in the Japanese gardens in the park. Delray Beach is a sister city to Miyazu in honor of George Morikami.

References

1880s births
1976 deaths
American farmers of Japanese descent
Florida pioneers
Japanese emigrants to the United States
People from Kyoto Prefecture
People from Delray Beach, Florida
Farmers from Florida